Sri Lankan Vellalar is a caste in Sri Lanka, predominantly found in the Jaffna peninsula and adjacent Vanni region, who comprise about half of the Sri Lankan Tamil population. They were traditionally involved in agriculture, but also included merchants, landowners and temple patrons. They also form part of the Sri Lankan Tamil diaspora.

They are reputed as a ritually and numerical dominant caste, who have contributed among the political elites of the Sri Lankan Tamils. Many of the Tamil Mudaliyars, a high colonial rank, were drawn from the Vellalar caste. In Eastern Sri Lanka are the Vellalars as other prominent castes there, further divided into kudis or matrilineal clans.

Etymology 
The word Vellalar is derived from their art of irrigation and cultivation. The word comes from the Tamil words veḷḷam  ("flood", "water" or "abundance") and āṇmai ("lordship" or "management"); thus the word literally means "those who manage water" or "lords of the floods". Dutch archives registered the Vellalar and the Govigama under the term Bellalas.

History

Mythological origin 
Some claim according to their myth to be the children of the Hindu goddess Parvati. According to the myth of the Pallars, are the Vellalar and Pallar descendant of two farmer brothers. The property of the younger brother Pallan got destroyed by a storm. The older brother Vellalan gave his younger brother Pallan shelter for him and his family. After the death of Vellalan, his wife became the owner of the property and forced Pallan and his family to become agricultural laborers for her.

Early history 
The Sri Lankan Vellalars share common origins with the Vellalars of Tamil Nadu. The Vellalar traditionally inhabited the Sangam landscape of Marutham. The earliest reference to the Vellala is attested to in the Tolkāppiyam, which divided the society into four classes Arasar, Andanar, Vanigar, and Vellalar. There were two types of the Vellalars, the cultivators called Velkudi Ulavar and the wealthy landowners called Kaniyalar or Kodikkalar. The Vellalar tribes are described as a landed gentry who irrigated the wet lands and the Karalar (use Vellalar as title) were the landed gentry in the dry lands. Karalar means "lord of clouds".

Medieval era 
The Kailayamalai, an account on Kalinga Magha, the founder of Jaffna Kingdom, narrates the migration of Vellalar Nattar chiefs from the Coromandel Coast of South India. Vellalar chiefs from the Malavar and Gangeyar clans were appointed to administrative office by the first Jaffna king Cinkaiariyan (ca. 1280 AD). The Vellalars who were village headmen and landlords bore the title Udaiyar.

Colonial era 

In the time of Portuguese Ceylon, the Vellalars were described as husbandmen, who were involved in tillage and cattle cultivation. According to S. Arasaratnam, Vellalar dominance was strengthened by Dutch colonizers after the fall of the Portuguese. The Portuguese had appointed the affluent Karaiyars and Madapallis to administrative offices. Karaiyars and Madapallis revolted against the new Dutch rule in September 1658, consequently leading to the Dutch favoring the Vellalars to administrative positions. The Dutch interpreted the local laws, later codified as Thesavalamai, as allowing landlords to own slaves. Thus the Vellalar chiefs and other landlord castes had the Koviars and also the Panchamar ("the fives") consisting of the Nalavars, Pallars, Paraiyars, Vannars, and Ambattars working under them as domestic servants altogether known as Kudimakkal. These castes were originally bonded to the service of the state, however, they were often illegally turned to be bonded to individual Vellalars as their dominance started growing. The growing power of the Vellalars was counterbalanced by removing the Madapallis from earlier suspicion and equally appoint them to the administrative office by the Dutch in the 1690s.

The Thesavalamai mentions the Koviars as descendant of the Vellalars, and intermarriage between them was not uncommon. According to historians, the Vellalar population increased between the 17th and 19th-century due to other castes and communities assimilating in Vellalar society after the fall of Jaffna Kingdom, which included castes such as the Agampadiyar (palace servants), Chettiar (merchants), Maravar (soldiers), Thanakkarar (temple managers), Madapallis (palace cooks and stewards), Malayalis, and Paradesis (foreigners, skilled workers). There used to be a concept of Periya Vellalan and Chinna Vellalan, where the Chinna Vellalan was a subdivision compromising the castes who had assimilated in the Vellalar identity.

During colonial rule, some Vellalars converted to Christianity. These conversions allowed them to hold land, properties and government offices. The Dutch minister Philippus Baldaeus of the 17th century, described the Christian Vellalars, Karaiyars and Madapallis as the most influential classes of Christians on the peninsula. Under Dutch rule in the 18th century, some Vellalars earned fortunes through tobacco cultivation. The Vellalars started to become a dominant caste in the Jaffna Peninsula and also the most numerous in the Dutch census.

Due to the effort of the religious reformer, Arumuka Navalar, the conversion to Christianity of many Hindu Vellalars was prevented. They became under his patronage, strict followers of Shaiva Siddhanta, and achieved dominance through ritual design. Well-to-do Vellalars from Jaffna and Colombo formed one of the political Sri Lankan Tamil elites, one of such being the Ponnambalam-Coomaraswamy family.

Modern era 
Vellalar political and ritual dominance was severely restricted due to the post-1983 Sri Lankan civil war domination of Tamil politics by the main rebel group Liberation Tigers of Tamil Eelam (LTTE) whose top leaders, such as Velupillai Prabhakaran, were mostly from the Karaiyar caste. The LTTE did not have caste distinctions and one of their ideologies were anti-casteism, seeking a united Tamil identity through recruiting of other castes and achieving a mixed-caste leadership. Following the old order, where the Vellalars formed partners with the Karaiyars, the LTTE gained support and recruitment from the Vellalars who also contributed as leaders and cadres.

The People's Liberation Organisation of Tamil Eelam (PLOTE), Tamil Eelam Liberation Organization (TELO) and Eelam Revolutionary Organisation of Students (EROS) were Vellalar dominated organizations, with several Vellalar cadres of these organization later joining the LTTE.

See also
Ponnambalam-Coomaraswamy family
Arumuga Navalar
List of Vellalar sub castes

References

External links
Sri Lankan Tamil society and politics-series
Chronology ofevents in Sri Lankan Tamil society

Sri Lankan Tamil castes
Vellalar